Ghongadikoppa is a village in Dharwad district of Karnataka, India.

Demographics 
As of the 2011 Census of India there were 47 households in Ghongadikoppa and a total population of 248 consisting of 132 males and 116 females. There were 34 children ages 0-6.

References

Villages in Dharwad district